

Sõrve Lighthouse (Estonian: Sõrve tuletorn) is a lighthouse located in Torgu Parish, on the island of Saaremaa, in Estonia. The current lighthouse is a cylindrical concrete tower, which was built to replace a temporary wooden structure lighthouse that served as a signal point between 1945 and 1960.

History 
The first lighthouse on the Sõrve Peninsula was built in 1646. The original structure of the lighthouse was wooden; however, the structure was replaced with stone in 1650, and designed by Heinrich Stegeling. The lighthouse was under private possession until 1737, when it was managed by the state. The rectangular structure of the lighthouse was reconstructed in 1770, and built higher in 1807. Another reconstruction occurred in 1863, when the lighthouse (at a height of 35 metres) was fitted with catoptric apparatus. The lighthouse had survived World War I, however its wooden interior was damaged by fire. During World War II, the whole structure was destroyed in the year of 1944. The temporary wooden octagonal structure was built in 1949, and was used up until 1960, when it was replaced by the current reinforced concrete lighthouse.

See also 

 List of lighthouses in Estonia

References

External links 

 

Lighthouses completed in 1960
Resort architecture in Estonia
Lighthouses in Estonia
Saaremaa Parish
Buildings and structures in Saaremaa
Tourist attractions in Saare County
1646 establishments in Sweden